Eugenio Rodríguez Vega (August 18, 1925 in San Ramón – March 10, 2008 in Santa Ana) was a Costa Rican writer, politician and historian. He was a recipient of the Magón National Prize for Culture in 2005.

1925 births
2008 deaths
People from San Ramón, Costa Rica
Costa Rican people of Spanish descent
National Liberation Party (Costa Rica) politicians
Education ministers of Costa Rica
Costa Rican male writers
Costa Rican historians
People of the Costa Rican Civil War
20th-century historians
20th-century male writers
20th-century Costa Rican writers